Roberto Dalla Vecchia (born 5 January 1968) is an Italian guitarist, composer, and singer. He is known for his expressive melodies and songs which include many references to traditional American music and bluegrass.

Biography
Dalla Vecchia was born in Vicenza, Italy. He began studying classic piano with his mother, a piano teacher, but soon switched to acoustic guitar. Influenced by American old-time music and bluegrass, he learnt flatpicking by listening to its exponents such as Clarence White, Tony Rice and Doc Watson. He also took lessons from the Italian guitarist and flatpicker Beppe Gambetta. Dalla Vecchia released his first solo album Open Spaces in 1998. In 2003, he won Acoustic Guitar magazine's "Homegrown CD" Award for his second album Sit Back. He currently performs at concerts and festivals and teaches workshops throughout Europe and USA, and runs his own Acoustic Guitar Workshop in Recoaro,Italy, every year and he is the promoter of  "vicenzAcustica in Vicenza, his home town, an annual concert featuring international guitarists. Since 2012, he is the director of the "orchestrAcustica", a flatpicking orchestra of 25 guitarists.

Dalla Vecchia has performed with artists such as Tommy Emmanuel, Frank Vignola, Jim Hurst, Mark Cosgrove, Clive Carroll, Jacques Stotzem, Tony McManus, Walter Lupi, Massimo Varini and others.

Discography

Studio albums
 1998 – Open Spaces Tring-Azzurra Records
 2002 – Sit Back
 2006 – Grateful 
 2008 – Unknown Legends
 2011 – Hand in Hand
 2012 – Morning Lights (with Luca Francioso)

Compilations
 EWOB 1999 – Strictly Country Records
 Vicenza in Musica 2000
 EWOB 2001 – Strictly Country Records
 Country in This Country Vol.2 2002- Ethnoworld Srl
 EWOB 2002 – Strictly Country Records
 Flatpicking 2003 – FGM Records
 EWOB 2007 – Strictly Country Records

Awards
 Homegrown CD Award 2003 for the album Sit Back
 Second place at Best Instrumental Album of Just Plain Folks Music Awards 2009 for the album Grateful
 OurStage Channel Prize 2009 for the track Sunflowers of the album Unknown Legends

References

External links
RobertoDallaVecchia.com
vicenzAcustica.com

Italian singer-songwriters
Italian guitarists
Italian male guitarists
People from Vicenza
1968 births
Living people